The Santa Fe Plaza is a National Historic Landmark in downtown Santa Fe, New Mexico in the style of traditional Spanish-American colonial cities. The plaza, or city square is a gathering place for locals and also a tourist attraction. It is home to annual events including Fiestas de Santa Fe, the Spanish Market, the Santa Fe Bandstand, and the Santa Fe Indian Market.

Listed on the National Register of Historic Places, the plaza consists of a central park lined with grass, trees, and benches. During Christmas time, the plaza is decorated with farolitos, luminarias, and trees lights. The park also includes a performing arts stage.

History 

Encompassed in the general plaza area are historic monuments, restaurants, businesses and art galleries, including the Palace of the Governors (the oldest public building in the U.S.), the New Mexico Museum of Art, Cathedral Basilica of Saint Francis of Assisi, and the Loretto Chapel. In true pueblo fashion, the Plaza architecture is traditional adobe. Just  from the Santa Fe ski basin, the Plaza dates back to the early 17th century when Santa Fe was settled by conquistadors. Until the mid-19th century, the Plaza lacked landscaping, and ownership of the area transitioned between the Spaniards and the Mexicans throughout the earlier years.

Pre-Columbian era 

The area now known as Santa Fe had been inhabited by Tewa and other peoples, for which there is archaeological evidence as near to the Plaza as the Sena compound.

Spanish era 
All Spanish colonial towns with a regional governor's office (for Santa Fe de Nuevo México, that was the Palace of the Governors) were required by the civic planning section of the laws of the Indies to have a Plaza de Armas to marshal the palace guard in. The original Plaza was a presidio surrounded by a large defensive wall that enclosed residences, barracks, a chapel, a prison and the Governor's palace. Eventually the wall gave way to large houses built by high-ranking Spanish officers and officials. In the early days, it was found at the end of El Camino Real (the Spanish Royal Road from Mexico City).

Mexican era 

With Mexico's Independence from Spain, in 1821, the Santa Fe Trail, a trade route connecting New Mexico with Missouri, was opened with its western terminus at the Santa Fe Plaza. Overland wagon caravans used the plaza to camp and unload trade goods. The Old Pecos Trail also passed nearby before it was rerouted.

U.S. territorial era 

After the New Mexico Territory was established, a fence was built around the plaza to keep out animals. Trees were also planted and pathways were introduced. A bandstand was added at various locations over time, as was the Soldiers' Monument in the plaza center.

U.S. statehood 

After New Mexico was admitted as the 47th state in 1912, a historic preservation plan was established. The plaza is now marked by structures in the Pueblo, Spanish and Territorial styles that reflect its history. Among the most noted are the original palacio, the Palace of the Governors, built between 1610 and 1612 and San Miguel Mission, a noted landmark (c. 1640), and one of the oldest churches in the United States. The plaza is surrounded by restaurants, shops, and museums. Many seasonal community events are held at the plaza.

On October 12, 2020, Indigenous People's Day, the obelisk portion of the Soldiers' Monument in the center of the plaza was toppled by protestors.

Points of interest 

The Plaza has several mature trees, street lamps, a banco, a central monument, a buried time capsule, a bandstand and a water fountain. Wireless internet access is also available as of 2019.

Notable residents
William S. Messervy, Santa Fe trader and acting Governor of New Mexico in 1854, lived in a house on the Plaza.

See also 

 National Register of Historic Places listings in Santa Fe County, New Mexico
 List of National Historic Landmarks in New Mexico

References

External links 

 Live WebCam

Buildings and structures in Santa Fe, New Mexico
Culture of Santa Fe, New Mexico
Mexican-American culture in New Mexico
National Historic Landmarks in New Mexico
Native Americans in Santa Fe, New Mexico
Parks in Santa Fe County, New Mexico
Parks on the National Register of Historic Places in New Mexico
Spanish-American culture in Santa Fe, New Mexico
Tourist attractions in Santa Fe, New Mexico
National Register of Historic Places in Santa Fe, New Mexico
Santa Fe Trail
Squares in the United States